The HB Studio (Herbert Berghof Studio) is a non-profit 501(c)(3) organization offering professional training in the performing arts through classes, workshops, free lectures, theater productions, theater rentals, a theater artist residency program, as well as full-time study through their International Student Program and Uta Hagen Institute.

Located in Greenwich Village, New York City, HB Studio offers training and development to aspiring and professional artists in acting, directing, playwriting, musical theatre, movement and the body, dialect study (speech and voice), scene study analysis, screenwriting and classes for young people. Select classes require an audition for admission.

History

Founded in 1945 by Viennese-born American actor/director Herbert Berghof, HB Studio is one of the original New York acting studios, providing training and practice in the performing arts.

In 1948, Uta Hagen joined the Studio as Berghof's artistic partner, and the two wed ten years later. Her master classes led to the writing of her books Respect for Acting and A Challenge for the Actor.

In 2010, HB Studio founded the Uta Hagen Institute, which offers full-time immersion in the practical approach to acting craft that characterized Uta Hagen's master classes and classic acting texts. Its two key programs, The Hagen Summer Intensive and The Hagen Core Training, are highly structured, integrated courses for students with serious professional and artistic intent.

Past faculty members include William Hickey and Jack Hofsiss.

Notable alumni
Notable alumni include:

Caroline Aaron
Christopher Abbott
F. Murray Abraham
Debbie Allen
Rae Allen
Mary Anthony
Matthew Arkin
Kerry Armstrong
Blanche Baker
Carroll Baker
Bob Balaban
Anne Bancroft
Susan Batson
Orson Bean
Bonnie Bedelia
Joy Behar
Candice Bergen
Emily Bergl
Shelley Berman
Clarice Blackburn
Pamela Blair
Stephen Bogardus
Peter Boyle
Matthew Broderick
Leslie Browne
Gary Burghoff
K Callan
Peggy Cass
Justin Chambers
Stockard Channing
Dana Claxton
Jill Clayburgh
James Coco
Kevin Conway
James Cromwell
Lindsay Crouse
Billy Crystal
Joseph Culp
Robert Culp
Claire Danes
Hope Davis
Drea de Matteo
Robert De Niro
Sandy Dennis
Dena Dietrich
Faye Dunaway
Griffin Dunne
Scott Ellis
Laura Esterman
Eva Evdokimova
Barbara Feldon
Tovah Feldshuh
Katie Finneran
Ellen Foley
Constance Ford
Victor Garber
Rita Gardner
Linda Geiser
Whoopi Goldberg
Tony Goldwyn
Lee Grant
Charles Grodin
Kathryn Grody
Stephen Adly Guirgis
Kathryn Harrold
Eileen Heckart
Dan Hedaya
David Hedison
William Hickey
Gerald Hiken
George Roy Hill
Pat Hingle
Judd Hirsch
Hal Holbrook
Earle Hyman
Anne Jackson
Salome Jens
Carol Kane
Lainie Kazan
Harvey Keitel
Lisa Kirk
Shirley Knight
Juliane Köhler
Harvey Korman
Jane Krakowski
Christine Lahti
Zohra Lampert
Jessica Lange
Linda Lavin
John Leguizamo
Jack Lemmon
Robert Sean Leonard
Romulus Linney
Joe Lisi
Kenneth Lonergan
Karen Ludwig
Lorna Luft
William H. Macy
Lori March
Nancy Marchand
Marsha Mason
Sheila McCarthy
Marion McCorry
Paul McCrane
Dylan McDermott
Darren McGavin
Donna McKechnie
Steve McQueen
Anne Meara
Dina Merrill
Bette Midler
Penelope Ann Miller
Liza Minnelli
Alfred Molina
Garrett Morris
Jack Mullaney
Tony Musante
Leonardo Nam
Alfredo Narciso
Kenneth Nelson
Cynthia Nixon
Jill O'Hara
Rochelle Oliver
Dael Orlandersmith
Al Pacino
Geraldine Page
Betsy Palmer
Joe Pantoliano
Corey Parker
Sarah Jessica Parker
Amanda Peet
Austin Pendleton
Barry Primus
Francesco Quinn
Ellis Rabb
Sheryl Lee Ralph
Christopher Reeve
Charles Nelson Reilly
Carl Reindel
Lee Richardson
Peter Riegert
Jason Robards
Sam Robards
Doris Roberts
Suzzy Roche
Paul Roebling
Herbert Ross
Mercedes Ruehl
David Saint
Eva Marie Saint
James Saito
Jaime Sánchez
Prunella Scales
Martha Schlamme
Annabella Sciorra
Kyra Sedgwick
George Segal
Molly Shannon
Ray Sharkey 
Wallace Shawn
Ron Silver
Victor Slezak
Anna Sokolow
Gus Solomons Jr.
Maureen Stapleton
Rod Steiger
Daniel Stern
Fisher Stevens
Jerry Stiller
Barbra Streisand
Elaine Stritch
Carol Ann Susi 
Kevin Sussman
Marlo Thomas
Lily Tomlin
Tom Troupe
Jo Van Fleet
Betsy von Furstenberg
Dee Wallace
Emma Walton
Jennifer Warren
James Waterston
Fritz Weaver
Sigourney Weaver
Peter Weller
Jane White
Mary Louise Wilson
Gene Wilder
Kelly Wolf
Scott Wolf
Rachel York

References

External links
 
 HB Studio records, 1939–2009, held by the Billy Rose Theatre Division, New York Public Library for the Performing Arts
 "HB Studio and HB Playwrights Foundation to Honor Stiller and Meara Nov. 10" by Andrew Gans, Playbill, November 5, 2008

Educational institutions established in 1945
Organizations based in New York City
Education in Manhattan
Performing arts education in the United States
1945 establishments in New York City
Drama schools in the United States
Greenwich Village
Theatre in New York City